Late Call may refer to:

 Late Call (TV programme), a Scottish short religious television programme
 Late Call (novel), a 1964 novel by Angus Wilson
 Late Call (TV series), a 1975 miniseries based on the novel